is a railway station on the Keihan Main Line in Joto-ku, Osaka, Japan, operated by the private railway operator Keihan Electric Railway.

Lines
Noe Station is served by the Keihan Main Line.

Station layout
The station has two side platforms serving two tracks on the 2nd level, outside of the passing tracks.

Platforms

Adjacent stations

History
Noe Station opened on 15 April 1901. It was rebuilt as an elevated station on 15 April 1970.

Passenger statistics
In 2011, the station was used by an average of 11,424 passengers daily.

Surrounding area
Osaka Municipal Joto Library
Joto Noe Post Office
Osaka Municipal Gamo Junior High School
Osaka Municipal Seiiku Elementary School
Noe-Uchindai Station (Osaka Municipal Subway Tanimachi Line)
JR-Noe Station (JR West Osaka Higashi Line)
Noe Water Shrine
Kanko Co., Ltd. (Keihan Group)

References

External links
 Keihan station information 

Jōtō-ku, Osaka
Railway stations in Osaka
Railway stations in Japan opened in 1910
Railway stations in Japan opened in 1901